Dmitri Anatolyevich Shershnev (born 1 August 1979) is a former Russian professional football player.

Club career
He played 4 seasons in the Russian Football National League for FC Metallurg Lipetsk and FC Neftekhimik Nizhnekamsk.

See also
Football in Russia

References

1979 births
Sportspeople from Lipetsk
Living people
Russian footballers
Association football midfielders
FC Fakel Voronezh players
FC Metallurg Lipetsk players
FC Volga Nizhny Novgorod players
FC Oryol players
FC Neftekhimik Nizhnekamsk players